Roxio is an American software company specializing in developing consumer digital media products. Its product line includes tools for setting up digital media projects, media conversion software and content distribution systems. The company formed as a spin-off of Adaptec's software division in 2001 and acquired MGI Software in 2002.

Sonic Solutions acquired Roxio in 2003, going on to acquire Simple Star and CinemaNow in 2008. Rovi Corporation acquired Sonic Solutions in 2010, but Rovi announced in January 2012 that it would sell Roxio to Canadian software company Corel. That acquisition closed on February 7, 2012.

Products
 Roxio Creator
 Roxio Toast
 Easy VHS to DVD
 Easy LP to MP3
 Popcorn
 DVDitPro
 PhotoShow
 RecordNow
 Back on Track
 Easy DVD Copy
 MyDVD
 Retrospect
 Roxio Game Capture
 Roxio Game Capture HD Pro

References

External links

American companies established in 2001
Software companies based in the San Francisco Bay Area
Companies based in Santa Clara, California
2001 establishments in California
Corel
2012 mergers and acquisitions
American subsidiaries of foreign companies
Software companies of the United States
2001 establishments in the United States
Companies established in 2001
Software companies established in 2001